Lovette George (December 9, 1961 – September 6, 2006) was an actress and singer in Broadway, off-Broadway and regional productions.

Shows included Uptown... It's Hot! (1986), Carousel (revival) (1994), Marie Christine (1999) and The Musical of Musicals (The Musical!) (2003). She understudied Kristin Chenoweth off-Broadway in A New Brain (1998).

Biography
Lovette George was born in Yonkers and drew part of her inspiration to perform from her mother, Carol, who is a concert singer. Lovette George earned a bachelor's degree in theatre from the State University of New York at Binghamton.

She played Carrie ("when Audra [McDonald] wasn't", she wrote in her Playbill bio) in the acclaimed Lincoln Center production of Carousel and appeared in Broadway's Uptown...It's Hot with Maurice Hines.

Playing a variety of musical theatre styles, she was nominated for a 2004 Drama Desk Award for The Musical of Musicals (The Musical!) for the York Theatre Company and later in its commercial run at Dodger Stages. She is also heard on the cast album, spoofing the styles of Stephen Sondheim, Kander and Ebb, Jerry Herman, Rodgers and Hammerstein and Andrew Lloyd Webber. She appeared as the lead role Pearl in the record-breaking German production of Andrew Lloyd Webber's Starlight Express (and is on its cast album).

Her credits also include off-Broadway's The Green Heart (Manhattan Theatre Club) and Eating Raoul and regional productions of Thunder Knocking at the Door (the Guthrie), The Hot Mikado (the Alliance) and The Most Happy Fella (St. Louis Rep/Cincinnati Playhouse).

Death
Lovette George died on September 6, 2006 from ovarian cancer, aged 44.

External links
 https://web.archive.org/web/20070226175908/http://www.playbill.com/news/article/101965.html

American musical theatre actresses
People from Manhattan
Deaths from ovarian cancer
2006 deaths
Deaths from cancer in New York (state)
1961 births
20th-century American singers
20th-century American women singers
21st-century American women